"Thinking of You" is a song released as a single by Sister Sledge in 1984 that became a hit in the UK. It was originally recorded for their 1979 album, We Are Family, and was included as the B-side to their UK top 20 single "Lost in Music". "Thinking of You" was written and produced by Nile Rodgers and Bernard Edwards, and, like many Sister Sledge hits, was built on the rhythmic foundations of their famous guitar and bass line arrangements.

Chart performance
By 1984, the group's chart fortunes had almost completely died out, with their 1983 album Bet Cha Say That to All the Girls failing to chart in any of the major territories. The belated issue of "Thinking of You" peaked at number 11 on the UK Singles Chart and number 20 in Ireland, reviving interest in the group in both countries, paving the way for a re-issue of "Lost in Music" in September 1984, when it reached number four in the UK, and their only UK number one hit, "Frankie", in June 1985. "Thinking of You" was remixed in 1993 after the success of the "We Are Family" remix, reaching number 17 in the UK, number 21 in Ireland, and number 88 in Australia in 1994.

Year-end charts

Certifications

Cover versions
2 Brothers on the 4th Floor, a Dutch rap duo, released a cover version in 1997 titled "I'm Thinking of You".

Eclipse was an Italian House project of Bini & Martini. They debuted in 1999 with their single "Makes Me Love You", which contained a sample of "Thinking of You".

Paul Weller covered this song on his 2004 album, Studio 150. This version made number 18 in the UK and later appeared on the 2005 	Echo compilation album by various artists, Acoustic 05. This song was also covered by Maureen Walsh (UK number 11 in 1990)and Blacknuss (Blacknuss 3, vocals by Nai-Jee-Ria). Jenna Ortega, an American actress which plays Aimee Moore in CSI: NY episode, "Unspoken", and Harley Diaz from Disney Channel's Stuck in the Middle.

Dimitri from Paris released a pair of remixes of Thinking of You in 2010, including a vocal and instrumental version. The vocal version was included on the Chic Organization box set released that year, Volume One - Savoir Faire.

Lisa Maxwell, a singer from Australia, also covered "Thinking of You" on her album Wish in 1997 (NZ number 50 and Japan's J-Wave chart number eight).

Kathy Sledge, lead singer of Sister Sledge and lead singer on the original recording, released a cover version of "Thinking of You" with house music duo Aristofreeks in 2015.

Scottish pop singer Joesef released a cover of the song in 2020 for Spotify's Singles x Pride campaign.

In popular culture

In 2020, the Dimitri from Paris mix famously became one of the theme songs to D-Nice's Club Quarantine DJ sets on Instagram Live.

References

Sister Sledge songs
Song recordings produced by Nile Rodgers
Songs written by Nile Rodgers
Songs written by Bernard Edwards
Song recordings produced by Bernard Edwards
1979 songs
1984 singles
1990 singles
1997 singles
2004 singles
2010 singles
2015 singles